Camilo Diaz Gregorio (25 September 1939 – 21 May 2018) was a Roman Catholic bishop.

Diaz Gregorio was born in the Philippines and was ordained to the priesthood in 1963. He served as  auxiliary bishop of Girus and as auxiliary bishop of the Roman Catholic Archdiocese of Cebu, Philippines from 1987 to 1989. Diaz Gregorio then served as bishop of the Roman Catholic Diocese of Bacolod from 1989 to 2000 and then served as bishop of the Roman Catholic Territorial Prelature of Batanes from 2003 to 2017.

Notes

1939 births
2018 deaths
21st-century Roman Catholic bishops in the Philippines
20th-century Roman Catholic bishops in the Philippines
People from Bacolod
People from Batanes